Charlie Murphy is an artist currently based in London, UK, whose work includes photography, sculpture, video and participatory events.
Her work has been presented at the Venice Biennale 2005, Edinburgh Festival 2006, and in galleries and museums including Tate Modern 2007, London’s Science Museum and The Science Gallery, Dublin. She is based at ACAVA studios, London and has been as ArtSway Artist Associate since 2003.

Life
She graduated from the Royal College of Art, with an MA in Fine Art (Photography), in 1999.
She is best known for her work exploring intimacy, sexuality and the competitive aspects of human nature. Through photographic, performative and sculptural processes, video, installations and live art events, several contexts in which a variety of people are invited to perform are created. Murphy's catalog of artistic works encompasses sensual and territorial behaviours, including the rituals and customs of rural and domestic life.

Recurrent materials in her practice include glass, light, fibre-optics, photographic papers and emulsions, latex and ribbons. Certain aspects of her practice involve the participation of a large number of people.

Murphy lectures in Photography at Kingston University, the University of Gloucester , the Arts University College at Bournemouth, and the University of East Anglia.

Works 

The Big Wheel: a live cartwheel chain event performed on London’s Millennium Bridge by over 150 participants for The Mayor’s Big Dance Festival. The longest ever acrobatic chain to be staged in London, this was created in collaboration with several gymnastic clubs and hosted by Tate Modern.
Country Dancing on the Circle Line (2004)
Seaside Sheep Show (2006), produced in collaboration with Aspex Gallery, Portsmouth
Opening - a performance and sculptural installation for Sugarcoated at Artsway (2006),
Salute - an ongoing performance work for tall ships, involving maritime training, aerial and dance choreography and a long term research and training project in flying trapeze.
Kiss-ins - since 1999, Charlie Murphy collects kisses from all over the world by asking participants to donate their kisses to her trademark ‘kiss-in’ events.  Murphy and her assistants invite couples, friends, and strangers to kiss for 90 seconds, while a dental alginate sets in their mouths. These casts are then turned into glass sculptures through a series of positive and negative mould making processes. The kiss-in events toured to a number of both national and international venues.
Show Multiples
The Anatomy of Desire (1999–2010)
The Big Wheel (2008) Live Cartwheel Chain performance on London’s Millennium Bridge
The Art of Tickling Trout and other Sensual Pleasures (2003)
Linnaeus - a series of glass sculptures on the plant sexuality within the botanical collections of The Museum of Garden History and The Linnaean Society, interpreting an illustration of Linnaeus’s ‘Sexual System’ by ‘Ehret’ from 1736.
Salute - performance staged in the rigging of Tall Ships, transforming a maritime peace gesture into visual theatre.
Cut Glass & Plant Harlotry photogram series (2004-ongoing) - referencing early 'photogenic' drawings by Fox Talbot and trompe-l'œil

Collections 
Her works are held by Hayley Newman, Tate Modern;  The Linnaean Society, London;  University of Aberystwth; Danielle Arnaud, London; Vic Reeves.

Publications 
The Anatomy of Desire, published by text+work, the Arts University College at Bournemouth, 2010. Includes essays by Luce Irigaray, Leonore Tiefer and Alistair Gentry. 
Plant Harlotry, booklet published to accompany an exhibition at Dissenters' Chapel, 2007
Sugarcoated, ArtSway, 2006, 
The Art of Tickling Trout and Other Sensual Pleasures, ArtSway, with essay by Kathy Kubicki, 2003, 
Rosette Contribution to Fash’n’Riot, Artist Limited Edition publication toured in British Council exhibition, 2002 & 2004
The Glass Border, exhibition catalogue, Danielle Arnaud Gallery, London, 1999
Light Sensitive, York City Art Gallery, 1998
Everyone In Farnham, Cornerhouse & James Hockey Gallery, Farnham 1994

References

External links 

Kensal Green past exhibitions
Charlie Murphy at Plymouth Arts Centre
The Guardian online

Living people
British women artists
Alumni of the Royal College of Art
Academics of the University of East Anglia
British contemporary artists
Year of birth missing (living people)
Academics of Arts University Bournemouth